Liolaemus goetschi is a species of lizard in the family  Liolaemidae. It is native to Argentina.

References

goetschi
Reptiles described in 1938
Reptiles of Argentina]
Taxa named by Lorenz Müller
Taxa named by Walter Hellmich